Eugenia Tsoumani-Spentza (died 6 December 2020) was a Greek politician who served as a MP.

References

Date of birth missing
2020 deaths
Greek politicians
Politicians from Athens